Kavlak Peak is the peak rising to 1160 m in the southeast foothills of Detroit Plateau on Nordenskjöld Coast in Graham Land, Antarctica.  It is situated in the west part of a narrow rocky ridge projecting 5 km eastwards into the upper course of Dinsmoor Glacier.

The peak is named after the settlement of Kavlak in Northern Bulgaria.

Location
British mapping in 1978.

Map
 British Antarctic Territory.  Scale 1:200000 topographic map.  DOS 610 Series, Sheet W 64 60.  Directorate of Overseas Surveys, UK, 1978.
 Antarctic Digital Database (ADD). Scale 1:250000 topographic map of Antarctica. Scientific Committee on Antarctic Research (SCAR). Since 1993, regularly upgraded and updated.

Notes

References
 Kavlak Peak. SCAR Composite Antarctic Gazetteer.
 Bulgarian Antarctic Gazetteer. Antarctic Place-names Commission. (details in Bulgarian, basic data in English)

External links
 Kavlak Peak. Copernix satellite image

Mountains of Graham Land
Bulgaria and the Antarctic
Nordenskjöld Coast